Eclipta bivitticollis is a species of beetle in the family Cerambycidae. It was described by Fisher in 1952.

References

Eclipta (beetle)
Beetles described in 1952